Band-e Korman (also Romanized as Band-e Kormān; also known as Band-e Garmān, Band-e Germān, and Band-e Gormān) is a village in Sirik Rural District, Byaban District, Minab County, Hormozgan Province, Iran. At the 2006 census, its population was 301, in 66 families.

References 

Populated places in Minab County